Semilimacella is a genus of gastropods belonging to the family Vitrinidae.

The species of this genus are found in the Balkans.

Species:

Semilimacella bonellii 
Semilimacella carniolica 
Semilimacella cephalonica

References

Vitrinidae